Aly Goni (born 25 February 1991) is an Indian actor and model who appears in Hindi television. He made his debut through participating in MTV's dating reality show Splitsvilla 5. Goni rose to fame after portraying Romesh Bhalla in StarPlus's romantic Yeh Hai Mohabbatein till 2019. He has also participated in stunt-based reality show Khatron Ke Khiladi 9, and Nach Baliye 9 both in 2019.

In 2020, Goni participated in Colors TV's reality show  Bigg Boss 14 where he finished at 4th place.

Early and personal Life 
Aly Goni was born on 25 February 1991 to a Muslim family in Bhaderwah, Jammu & Kashmir. He is the son of Amjad Goni and Ruby Goni and has a sister named Ilham Goni. Goni met actress Jasmin Bhasin during Fear Factor: Khatron Ke Khiladi 9 in 2018. Later the two begun dating each other in 2021 after appearing in Bigg Boss 14.

Career
In 2012, Aly started his career by participating in the reality show MTV Splitsvilla 5.

In 2013, he made his acting debut with Star Plus's Yeh Hai Mohabbatein where he played Romi Bhalla until its end in December 2019.

In 2015, he started playing the main lead Raj Kapoor by replacing Vibhav Roy in Star Plus's Kuch Toh Hai Tere Mere Darmiyaan and the show went off the air in January 2016.

In 2016, he played the role of Kabir Raichand in &TV's Yeh Kahan Aa Gaye Hum. He later played the role of Virat in Life OK's Bahu Hamari Rajni Kant.

In 2017, he played Sushant in StarPlus's Dhhai Kilo Prem.

In 2018, he appeared as Naman Kapoor in Sony TV's Dil Hi Toh Hai. In September 2018, He made his music video debut with song "Cheater Mohan" which was sung by Kanika Kapoor. He also played a negative character of Vyom in Naagin 3.

In 2019, he participated in Colors TV's Fear Factor: Khatron Ke Khiladi 9. He also appeared in Colors TV's comedy show Khatra Khatra Khatra. In June 2019, he did his second music video named "Tere Jism 2".In July 2019, he participated in Star Plus's dance reality show Nach Baliye 9 with Nataša Stanković as an ex couple.

In 2020, he participated in Colors TV's Fear Factor: Khatron Ke Khiladi – Made in India. In November 2020, he entered Colors TV's Bigg Boss 14 as a wild-card contestant

He made his web series debut as Surya Sethi in ZEE5's Jeet Ki Zid in January 2021.

In the media 
Goni was ranked 12th in 2018, 14th in 2019 and 3rd in 2020 in the Times Of India's 20 Most Desirable Men on Indian Television.

He was ranked at 22nd position in the Times of India's 50 Most Desirable Men of 2020.

Filmography

Television

Special appearances

Web series

Music videos

See also 
 List of Indian television actors

References

External links 

1991 births
Living people
People from Bhaderwah
Male actors from Jammu and Kashmir
Indian male television actors
Indian male models
Male actors in Hindi cinema
Actors from Mumbai
21st-century Indian male actors
Fear Factor: Khatron Ke Khiladi participants
Bigg Boss (Hindi TV series) contestants